Payan or Payán is a surname. Notable people with the surname include:

 Ana Rosa Payán, Mexican right-wing politician, Director of the National System for Integral Family Development
 Benoît Payan (born 1978), French politician and mayor of Marseille
 Claude-François de Payan (1766–1794), political figure of the French Revolution
 Eliseo Payán (1825–1895), Colombian lawyer, politician, and military officer
 Eugene Payan (1888–1971), Canadian ice hockey player
 Ferdinand Payan (1870–1961), French bicyclist who competed in the first Tour de France
 Ilka Tanya Payán (1943–1996), Dominican-born actress and attorney, later an HIV/AIDS activist in the United States
 Joseph-François de Payan (1759–1852), political figure during the French Revolution, brother of Claude-François de Payan

See also
Paya (disambiguation)
Payana
Payani
Payn
Payyans